This is a list of rivers in Rwanda. This list is arranged by drainage basin, with respective tributaries indented under each larger stream's name.

Congo basins
The western third of Rwanda is mainly covered by a mountain range to the east of the Albertine Rift.  Rivers drain the west side of this range into the Congo River basin via the Ruzizi River, ultimately discharging into the Atlantic Ocean.  The main rivers in Rwanda that supply the Congo River basin are the Sebeya, Koko, Ruhwa, Rubyiro and Ruzizi.
Congo River (Democratic Republic of the Congo)
Lualaba River (Democratic Republic of the Congo)
Lukuga River (Democratic Republic of the Congo)
Lake Tanganyika
Ruzizi River
Lake Kivu
Sebeya River
Koko River, Rutsiro District
Rubyiro River
Ruhwa River
Koko River, Rusizi District

Nile Basin
Most of Rwanda lies to the east of the Congo-Nile Divide and drains into the Nile basin.  The main rivers are Mwogo, Rukarara, Mukungwa, Base, Nyabarongo and the Akanyaru.
The Nyabarongo is called the Akagera after receiving the waters of Lake Rweru.
Nile River
Lake Victoria
Kagera River
Nyabarongo River / Akagera
Mbirurume
Mwogo
 Rukarara
Mukungwa
Base
Akanyaru

References

Central Intelligence Agency 1996
United Nations 2006
GEOnet Names Server

Rwanda
Rivers